is a Prefectural Natural Park in eastern Kumamoto Prefecture, Japan. Established in 1967, the park spans the municipalities of Hikawa, Itsuki, Misato, Sagara, Yamae, and Yatsushiro.

See also
 National Parks of Japan

References

External links
  Map of Natural Parks of Kumamoto Prefecture

Parks and gardens in Kumamoto Prefecture
Protected areas established in 1967
1967 establishments in Japan